The 2007–08 Slovak 1.Liga season was the 15th season of the Slovak 1. Liga, the second level of ice hockey in Slovakia. 15 teams participated in the league, and HC 05 Banska Bystrica won the championship.

Regular season

Pre-Playoffs 
 HK Trnava – HK FTC Nové Zámky 3:0 (5:1, 3:1, 5:2)
 HC 07 Prešov – HC 46 Bardejov 3:2 (3:2, 2:3, 2:3 n.P., 3:1, 3:1)
 HK 95 Považská Bystrica – MšHK Prievidza 3:2 (0:2, 7:3, 3:1, 5:6, 4:0)
 HK VTJ Trebišov – ŠHK 37 Piešťany 1:3 (2:6, 3:2 n.P., 3:4 n.P., 3:4 n.V.)

Playoffs

Quarterfinals 

 HK Spišská Nová Ves – ŠHK 37 PATRÍCIA Piešťany 4:0 (3:0, 6:2, 7:4, 8:2)
 HC ’05 Banská Bystrica – HK 95 Považská Bystrica 4:1 (9:1, 6:2, 0:1, 2:1sn, 7:1)
 HK Ružinov 99 Bratislava – HK Lietajúce Kone Prešov 3:4 (3:2, 3:4PP, 2:7, 2:4, 3:0, 3:2sn, 2:3)
 HC Dukla Senica – HK Trnava 3:4 (0:2, 2:5, 4:3sn, 1:5, 1:0, 3:2sn, 1:3)

Semifinals 

 HK Spišská Nová Ves – HK Lietajúce Kone Prešov 4:1 (3:2, 2:1sn, 2:1, 2:3, 2:1)
 HC ’05 Banská Bystrica – HK Trnava 4:0 (3:2PP, 5:1, 2:1, 5:2)

Final 

 HK Spišská Nová Ves – HC ’05 Banská Bystrica 1:4 (2:3PP, 1:4, 4:3, 1:3, 0:1)

External links
 Season on hockeyarchives.info

Slovak 1. Liga
Slovak 1. Liga seasons
Liga